Herbert Kelly was a priest.

Herbert Kelly or Kelley may also refer to:

Herb Kelly, baseball player
Herbert Kelley, radioman and namesake of Kelley Nunatak
Herbert Kelley, designer of World War I Aeroplanes Fokker D.VII

See also
Bert Kelly (disambiguation)